The Festiniog Railway Little Wonder was a  steam locomotive built by George England for the Festiniog Railway in 1869.

Design
Little Wonder was a Double Fairlie type articulated locomotive designed by Robert Francis Fairlie. It was the first Double Fairlie locomotive on the Festiniog Railway and the fourth Double Fairlie locomotive to be built. It was delivered to the railway in July 1869. It was an improvement on earlier designs because it had two fireboxes, instead of one, and this allowed it to steam more freely.

In 1870, Fairlie invited guests to witness Little Wonder in a trial against the Festiniog Railway's existing locomotives Mountaineer and Welsh Pony. Amongst those in attendance were the second Duke of Sutherland, the Imperial Russian Commissioners, the Commissioners of the Indian Government, and Captain Tyler of the Board of Trade. Little Wonder hauled a train of 112 wagons weighing 206 tones up the line at an average speed of 12 1/2 mph. Welsh Pony was only just able to haul a train of 26 wagons weighing 73 tons at a maximum speed of 5 mph.

Performance
Little Wonder was hailed as a great success and attracted attention from around the world. However, various mechanical problems arose and the engine required frequent repairs. It was withdrawn from service in 1882.

See also
 Ffestiniog Railway rolling stock

References

External links
 Festipedia page on Festiniog Railway locomotives

Ffestiniog Railway
Narrow gauge locomotives of the United Kingdom
George England and Company locomotives
0-4-4-0T locomotives
Railway locomotives introduced in 1869
Scrapped locomotives
Individual locomotives of Great Britain